American singer Liza Minnelli has released eleven studio albums—Liza! Liza! (1964), It Amazes Me (1965), There Is a Time (1966), Liza Minnelli (1968), Come Saturday Morning (1969), New Feelin' (1970), The Singer (1973), Tropical Nights (1977), Results (1989), Gently (1996), and Confessions (2010). Simultaneously, she contributed to five original cast recordings and eight soundtrack albums, respectively—Best Foot Forward (1963), Flora the Red Menace (1965), The Dangerous Christmas of Red Riding Hood (1965), Cabaret (1972), Liza with a "Z": A Concert for Television (1972), Lucky Lady (1975), A Matter of Time (1976), New York, New York (1977), The Act (1978), The Rink (1984), Stepping Out (1991), Music from The Life: A New Musical (1995) and Sex and the City 2 (2010). Ten live sets were issued as well, such as entitled "Live" at the London Palladium (1965) recorded with Judy Garland, Live at the Olympia in Paris (1972), Live at the Winter Garden (1974), Live at Carnegie Hall (1981), At Carnegie Hall (1987), Live from Radio City Music Hall (1992), Paris — Palais des Congrès: Intégrale du spectacle (1995) along with Charles Aznavour, Minnelli on Minnelli: Live at the Palace (1999), Liza's Back (2002) and Liza's at The Palace.... (2008). Her discography also features eighteen greatest hits compilations, thirty-three singles, five video albums, five music videos and thirteen other appearances.

Albums

Studio albums

Live albums

Notes
A  Liza's at The Palace... charted on the component Top Independent Albums chart in USA at number #42.

Soundtracks

Notes
B  In the UK, Sex and the City 2 charted at number 7 on the UK Compilation Chart.

Cast recordings

Compilations

Singles

C  "Theme from New York, New York" reached number 4 on the Bubbling Under Hot 100 in the US.

Other appearances

Tribute by other artists
1990: "Keep It Together" by Madonna — the closing song of the set list on her Blond Ambition World Tour (her nod to Cabaret)

Videos

Video albums

Music videos

See also

 List of EMI artists
 List of former A&M Records artists
 List of Columbia Records artists
 List of Epic Records artists
 List of Decca Records artists
 List of AFI's 100 Years...100 Songs
 List of songs about New York City
 List of Broadway musicals stars
 List of persons who have won Academy, Emmy, Grammy, and Tony Awards
 List of performers on Top of the Pops
 List of Royal Variety Performances

Notes

References
General

Specific

External links
OfficialLizaMinnelli.com > Discography (official website)

Discography
Discographies of American artists
Pop music discographies